Bobylev and Bobyleva are masculine and feminine forms of a common Russian surname. Notable people with the surname include:

Ivan Bobylev (b. 1991), a Russian football player.
Leonid Bobylev (b. 1949), a Russian composer.
Maksim Bobylev (b. 1992), a Russian football player.
Vladimir Bobylev (b. 1997), a Russian professional ice hockey player.

Russian-language surnames